Angelo Bruno (born Angelo Annaloro; ; (May 21, 1910 – March 21, 1980) was a Sicilian-American mobster, notable for being boss of the Philadelphia crime family for two decades until his assassination. Bruno was known as "the Gentle Don" due to his preference for conciliation over violence, in stark contrast to his successors.

Early years
Born in Villalba, Province of Caltanissetta, Sicily, Bruno immigrated to the United States as a child and settled in South Philadelphia with his brother, Vito. He was the son of a foundry worker who opened a small grocery store at 4341 North Sixth Street in Feltonville, Philadelphia. Angelo helped his father at the store until 1922, at the age of twelve when he first entered school but attended for only a few years before dropping out of South Philadelphia High School to open his own grocery store at Eighth and Annin streets in Passyunk Square, Philadelphia. Bruno was a close associate of New York Gambino crime family boss Carlo Gambino. Living with Bruno was a cousin of mobster John Simone. Bruno dropped the name Annaloro and replaced it with his paternal grandmother's maiden name, Bruno. His sponsor into the Philadelphia mafia was Michael Maggio, a convicted murderer with a national reputation, and the founder of M. Maggio Cheese Corp. (since bought up by Crowley Foods).

Bruno was married to Assunta "Sue" Bruno (née Maranca; 1913–2007), his childhood sweetheart, from 1931 until his death. They had two children, Michael and Jean. Bruno owned an extermination company in Trenton, New Jersey, an aluminum products company in Hialeah, Florida, and a share in the Plaza Hotel in Havana, Cuba. Bruno's first arrest was in 1928 for reckless driving. Subsequent arrests included firearms violations, operating an illicit alcohol still, illegal gambling, and receiving stolen property.

Family leader
In 1959, Bruno succeeded Joseph Ida as boss of the Philadelphia family. Over the next twenty years, Bruno successfully avoided the intense media and law enforcement scrutiny and outbursts of violence that plagued other crime families. Bruno himself avoided lengthy prison terms despite several arrests; his longest term was two years for refusing to testify before a grand jury. Bruno forbade family involvement in narcotics trafficking, preferring more traditional Cosa Nostra operations, such as bookmaking and loansharking. However, Bruno did permit other gangs to distribute heroin in Philadelphia for a share of the proceeds. This arrangement angered some family members who wanted a share of the drug-dealing profits.

Bruno preferred to operate through bribery and soft power rather than murder. For example, he banished violent soldier Nicodemo "Little Nicky" Scarfo to the then-backwater of Atlantic City, New Jersey after he was charged with manslaughter.

Rebellion and death

On March 21, 1980, the 69-year-old Bruno was killed by a shotgun blast to the head as he sat in his car in front of his home near the intersection of 10th Street and Snyder Avenue in the Lower Moyamensing neighborhood of South Philadelphia; his driver, John Stanfa, was wounded. It is believed that the killing was ordered by Antonio Caponigro, Bruno's consigliere. A few weeks later, Caponigro's lifeless body was found, naked and battered, in the trunk of a car in the Bronx. The Commission had reportedly ordered Caponigro's murder because he assassinated Bruno without their sanction. Other Philadelphia family members found to be involved in Bruno's murder were tortured and killed.

The murder sparked a mob war in Philadelphia, which claimed over 20 lives over the next four years, including the succeeding boss Philip "Chicken Man" Testa, and his son Salvatore Testa.

In February 2016, author and historian Celeste Morello began an effort to designate Bruno's home a historical landmark. In March 2016, a historical landmark advisory committee ruled against the request.

In popular culture
Bruno is portrayed by Chazz Palminteri in the film Legend (2015) and Harvey Keitel in the film The Irishman (2019).

See also

List of crime bosses
List of unsolved murders

References

Further reading
Blood and Honor: Inside the Scarfo Mob - The Mafia's Most Violent Family by George Anastasia, 2003, 
Bureau of Narcotics, U.S. Treasury Department, "Mafia: the Government's Secret File on Organized Crime", HarperCollins Publishers 2007 
Morello, Celeste Anne. Book One Before Bruno: The History of the Mafia and La Cosa Nostra in Philadelphia. Publication date: 4/28/2000, 
Morello, Celeste Anne. Book Two Before Bruno: The History of the Philadelphia Mafia, 1931-1946. Publication date: 11/28/2001, 
Morello, Celeste Anne. Book Three Before Bruno and How He Became Boss: The History of the Philadelphia Mafia, Book 3--1946-1959. Publication date: 8/28/2005,

External links
American Mafia's brief history of the Mafion sentencea in Philadelphia

1910 births
1980 deaths
1980 murders in the United States
American crime bosses
American Roman Catholics
Burials in Pennsylvania
Deaths by firearm in Pennsylvania
Italian emigrants to the United States
Male murder victims
Murdered American gangsters of Sicilian descent
People murdered by the Philadelphia crime family
Gangsters from Philadelphia
People murdered in Pennsylvania
Prohibition-era gangsters
Unsolved murders in the United States